Zaghouan Governorate is one of the twenty-four governorates (provinces) of Tunisia and is in north-eastern Tunisia. The capital is the town of Zaghouan.

Geography
The area is roughly circular and lies above the low coastal plains; it has a summit of  close to its centrally-located capital on the west side of the founding city.  The summit sits on one of two north-east to south-west escarpments forming part of the dorsal Atlas Mountains commencing here close to the east coast and Tunisia's capital city, Tunis.  The Oued Mellane drains the west and north of the province, having risen in the province to the south-west Siliana and then discharging into the Gulf of Tunis in the southern contiguous districts to the capital city, in particular flowing through Ben Arous the governorate of which takes in land immediately due south of the city centre.  As such Zaghouan has no coastline, however its climate remains warm Mediterranean, with significant winter and early spring rainfall.  The main road from Tunis to the city of Kairouan, inland from Sousse, passes through the town of El Fahs in the west of the province.  A railway passes through the same city leading to the mid-west of the country, which is in turn is connected back to the east coast.

Administrative divisions
The governorate is divided into six delegations (mutamadiyat), listed below with their populations at the 2004 and 2014 Censuses:

Six municipalities are in Zaghouan Governorate:

References

 
Governorates of Tunisia
1976 establishments in Tunisia